This is a list of rural localities in Bryansk Oblast. Bryansk Oblast (Bryanskaya oblast) is a federal subject of Russia (an oblast). Its administrative center is the city of Bryansk. As of the 2010 Census, its population was 1,278,217.

Brasovsky District 
Rural localities in Brasovsky District:

 Alexandrovskoye
 Brasovo
 Chayanka
 Chaykino
 Chistopolyansky
 Kamenka
 Krasnopolye
 Novoye
 Verkhneye

Bryansky District 
Rural localities in Bryansky District:

 Baldyzh
 Betovo
 Bolshaya Dubrava
 Dobrun
 Glinishchevo
 Kabalichi
 Khotylyovo
 Kurnyavtsevo
 Lesnoye
 Michurinsky
 Mirny
 Oktyabrskoye
 Opakhan
 Otradnoye
 Paltso
 Putyovka
 Sevryukovo
 Suponevo
 Yeliseyevichi

Dubrovsky District 
Rural localities in Dubrovsky District:

 Bobrovnya
 Davydchi
 Kutets
 Rekovichi

Dyatkovsky District 
Rural localities in Dyatkovsky District:

 Druzhba
 Klyonovsky
 Malygin
 Never
 Rodniki
 Vereshchovka

Gordeyevsky District 
Rural localities in Gordeyevsky District:

 Gordeyevka
 Mirny

Karachevsky District 
Rural localities in Karachevsky District:

 Alexeyeva
 Alymova
 Amozovsky
 Bavykina
 Berezovka
 Bocharki
 Dronova
 Dunayevsky
 Frolovka
 Frolovsky
 Karpovka
 Khokhlovka
 Kocherzhinka
 Lipovka
 Moiseyeva Gora
 Mokroye
 Morozovka
 Mylinka
 Olkhovka
 Osinovye Dvoriki
 Pechki
 Priyutovo
 Semyonovka
 Tsaryovo Zaymishche
 Vereshcha
 Yakovleva

Kletnyansky District 
Rural localities in Kletnyansky District:

 Alexeyevka
 Bobrov
 Bolotnya
 Boryatino
 Kochetov
 Lutna
 Michurino
 Mirny
 Muzhinovo
 Novozheyevka
 Roshcha

Klimovsky District 
Rural localities in Klimovsky District:

 Brovnichi
 Dobryn
 Luzhki
 Mitkovka
 Novy Ropsk
 Novy Varin
 Novye Yurkovichi
 Opteni
 Shamovka
 Stary Ropsk
 Zabrama

Klintsovsky District 
Rural localities in Klintsovsky District:

 Berezovka
 Chemerna
 Gulyovka
 Korzhovka-Golubovka
 Malaya Topal
 Olkhovka
 Polyana
 Smolevichi
 Sosnovka
 Zasnovye

Klintsy 
Rural localities in Klintsy urban okrug:

 Ardon
 Zaymishche

Komarichsky District 
Rural localities in Komarichsky District:

 Arkino
 Babinets
 Berezovets
 Gorki
 Kokino
 Radogoshch
 Vasilyok
 Zarechnaya

Krasnogorsky District 
Rural localities in Krasnogorsky District:

 Morozovka
 Perelazy
 Uvelye

Mglinsky District 
Rural localities in Mglinsky District:

 Belovodka
 Chernovitsa
 Divovka
 Stepnoy

Navlinsky District 
Rural localities in Navlinsky District:

 Byakovo
 Cheryomushki
 Druzhnaya
 Partizanskoye
 Peschany
 Privolye
 Sadovy
 Sosnovskoye

Novozybkovsky District 
Rural localities in Novozybkovsky District:

 Snovskoye
 Starye Bobovichi

Pochepsky District 
Rural localities in Pochepsky District:

 Baklan
 Bumazhnaya Fabrika
 Dmitrovo
 Dubrava
 Gromyki
 Gubostovo
 Kozlovka
 Krasnomayskaya
 Lapino
 Moskovsky
 Nelzhichi
 Oktyabrsky
 Ozarenny
 Pervomayskoye
 Pervomaysky
 Pochinok
 Progress
 Rechitsa
 Rogovo
 Setolovo
 Tuboltsy
 Vesenny
 Vialky
 Zarechye
 Zhitnya (settlement)
 Zhitnya (village)

Pogarsky District 
Rural localities in Pogarsky District:

 Borshchovo
 Chausy
 Chaykino
 Chekhovka
 Goritsy
 Lobki
 Zarechnoye

Rognedinsky District 
Rural localities in Rognedinsky District:

 Shokhovka
 Soglasiye

Sevsky District 
Rural localities in Sevsky District:

 Dobrun
 Knyaginino
 Pervomayskoye
 Podlesny
 Podyvotye
 Pushkino
 Trudovik
 Yasnoye Solntse
 Zarechny
 Zaytsevsky
 Zemledelets

Starodubsky District 
Rural localities in Starodubsky District:

 Chubkovichi
 Desyatukha
 Dneprovka
 Gartsevo
 Gorislovo
 Gridenki
 Khomutovka
 Kurkovichi
 Levenka
 Luzhki
 Malinovka
 Melensk
 Merenovka
 Nizhneye
 Novomlynka
 Ostroglyadovo
 Ozyornoye
 Pecheniki
 Sadovaya
 Stepok
 Voronok
 Yelionka
 Zhecha

Suzemsky District 
Rural localities in Suzemsky District:

 Berezovka
 Dobrun
 Negino
 Nerussa
 Pavlovichi
 Zyornovo

Trubchevsky District 
Rural localities in Trubchevsky District:

 Krasnoye
 Kvetun
 Subbotovo

Unechsky District 
Rural localities in Unechsky District:

 Berezina
 Dubrovka
 Luzhki
 Olkhovy
 Ozyorny
 Staraya Guta
 Vishnyovoye
 Zhudilovo

Vygonichsky District 
Rural localities in Vygonichsky District:

 Beryozovaya Roshcha
 Desnyansky
 Kokino
 Sadovy

Zhiryatinsky District 
Rural localities in Zhiryatinsky District:

 Yeliseyevichi
 Zarechnaya
 Zhiryatino

Zhukovsky District 
Rural localities in Zhukovsky District:

 Berezhki
 Berezovka
 Ovstug
 Tsvetniki

Zlynkovsky District 
Rural localities in Zlynkovsky District:

 Dobrodeyevka
 Guta
 Muravinka
 Sennoye
 Zelyonaya Roshcha

See also 
 
 Lists of rural localities in Russia

References 

Bryansk Oblast